The Border is a 2007 Finnish-Russian war drama film directed by Lauri Törhönen. Set in the spring of 1918, right after the Finnish Civil War, the film is about a Finnish officer who is sent to the village of Rajajoki to form a border between Finland and Soviet Russia.

The film's main character Carl von Munck is based on Kai Donner and his experiences during the post-civil war period. His son Jörn Donner is one of the film's producers.

Cast 
 Martin Bahne as Carl von Munck
 Minna Haapkylä as Maaria Lintu
 Tommi Korpela as Heikki Kiljunen
 Leonid Mozgovoy as Major Gentsch
 Hannu-Pekka Björkman as Sergeant 1st Class Muranen
 Lauri Nurkse as Lieutenant Suutari
 Orvo Björninen as Doctor Perret
 Pauli Poranen as Edvin Lintu
 Roman Schatz as Major Berner
 Hannu Kahakorpi as General Jyrinkoski
 Eeva Putro as Piika Pietarista

References

External links 
  
 

2000s war drama films
Films set in 1918
Films set in Finland
Films shot in Finland
Finnish Civil War
Finnish war drama films
Russian war drama films
2007 drama films
2007 films
Finnish multilingual films
Russian multilingual films
2007 multilingual films
Russian World War II films
Russian-language Finnish films